Seed Health, popularly known as Seed, is an American health and life science company, most known for developing probiotics. Founded in 2015 by Ara Katz and Raja Dhir, Seed was founded to "use bacteria to improve human and environmental health". The company's main product, the probiotic DS-01, is sold direct to consumer, forgoing traditional brick-and-mortar retail.

In 2021, Seed raised a $40m Series A, allowing expansion into the skin microbiome, oral microbiome, vaginal microbiome, and infant microbiome. Aside from SeedLabs, which develops solutions to environmental challenges, the company develops its products through academic partnerships, currently with: Caltech, Harvard University, MIT, the University of Zurich and Cleveland Clinic.

History 
Seed was founded in Los Angeles in 2015 and incorporated as Seed Health, Inc. to operate as a microbial sciences company. CNBC and Bloomberg note their initial focus was to be a microbial sciences company 'using bacteria to improve human and ecological health'.

Its founders and Co-CEOs are consumer tech entrepreneur Ara Katz and microbiome entrepreneur Raja Dhir. Katz previously co-founded mobile commerce company, Spring, and was a fellow at the MIT Media Lab. Dhir led academic collaborations with Primary Investigators from the Human Microbiome Project, alongside developing prior microbiome patents.

In February 2021, the company announced it had acquired New York-based Auggi Technologies Inc., using artificial intelligence to track and analyze digestive health. In July 2022, Seed partnered with Axial Therapeutics to "develop probiotics and therapeutics that [...] target anxiety, depression and mental wellbeing".

As of 2022, Seed has 92 employees. The company states its research partners as Caltech, Harvard University, MIT, University of Zurich, Stanford University, Mass General Hospital, and Cleveland Clinic.

Leadership structure 
Seed is led by Dhir and Katz as co-CEOs, and advised by a Board of Directors of Caltech Microbiology Professor Sarkis Mazmanian and Investor Ernesto Schmitt. In 2022, Seed appointed Dirk Gevers, Former head of J&J's Janssen Human Microbiome Institute, as Chief Scientific Officer. Gevers was previously Group Leader of Microbial Systems and Communities at the Broad Institute of MIT and Harvard.

Seed's Scientific Board is led by Dhir and includes George M. Church, The Robert Winthrop Professor of Genetics at Harvard Medical School and Professor of Health Sciences and Technology at Harvard and MIT, Jacques Ravel, Director of the Institute for Genome Sciences at the University of Maryland and Kari C. Nadeau, Professor of Allergy and the director of the Sean N Parker Center for Allergy Research at Stanford.

SeedLabs and others 
In 2018, Seed established SeedLabs to 'to develop novel applications of bacteria to enhance biodiversity and recover ecosystems impacted by human activity'. In 2018, SeedLabs was awarded in Time Magazine's 2018 best inventions for a probiotic for honeybees, and as a Fast Company 'World Changing Idea'. SeedLabs is currently working with Massachusetts Institute of Technology, Georgia Tech and Harvard Medical School to degrade plastics using microbes, including PET plastics in spaceflight.

Funding and revenue 
Seed's Series A raised $40m led by The Craftory with participation from Artis Ventures, Founders Fund, Greycroft, Collaborative Fund. The series A was used to ‘go beyond the gut’. Backers include Cameron Diaz, Jessica Biel and Karlie Kloss. In 2021, WWD noted Seed's consumer adoption – '8,948 percent three-year growth rate' by the end of the second quarter 2021. With the raise, the company was said to be interested in an Asia-Pacific region expansion, where the market was projected to expand 46 percent over five years.

Products and distribution 
Seed has two products. Their DS-01 product and their PDS-08 product. The latter comes in powdered sachet form.

Seed sells both products on a 30-day, refillable, supply model. In 2021, Seed announced to Fast Company Magazine that they were carbon-negative, and released an 80-page field-guide.

Products 

 DS-01; a 24-strain broad spectrum probiotic (clinical trial on IBS patients under Dr. Anthony Lembo at Harvard Medical School).
 PDS-08; an 8-strain microbial synbiotic.

Seed's DS-01 underwent clinical trials regarding 'inflammatory cytokines, urolithin production, and recovery after broad-spectrum antibiotics'.

References 

Life sciences industry
Medical technology companies of the United States
Companies based in Los Angeles
American companies established in 2015